Goghat is a village in the Goghat I CD block in the Arambag subdivision of the Hooghly district in the Indian state of West Bengal.

Geography

Location

Area overview
The Arambagh subdivision, presented in the map alongside, is divided into two physiographic parts – the Dwarakeswar River being the dividing line. The western part is upland and rocky – it is extension of the terrain of neighbouring Bankura district. The eastern part is flat alluvial plain area.  The railways, the roads and flood-control measures have had an impact on the area. The area is overwhelmingly rural with 94.77% of the population living in rural areas and 5.23% of the population living in urban areas.

Note: The map alongside presents some of the notable locations in the subdivision. All places marked in the map are linked in the larger full screen map.

Demographics
According to the 2011 Census of India, Goghat had a total population of 5,495 of which 2,798 (51%) were males and 2,699 (49%) were females. Population in the age range 0–6 years was 580. The total number of literate persons in Goghat was 4,135 (84.13% of the population over 6 years).

Civic administration

Police station
Goghat police station has jurisdiction over Goghat I and Goghat II CD blocks.

CD block HQ
The headquarters of Goghat I CD block are located at Goghat.

Transport
EMU services, earlier operating from Howrah to Arambag, was extended to Goghat railway station, after completion of the electrified broad gauge Tarakewar-Goghat sector of the Tarakeswar-Bishnupur extension of the Sheoraphuli–Bishnupur branch line.

References

Villages in Hooghly district